Anisopodesthes zikani is a species of beetle in the family Cerambycidae, the only species in the genus Anisopodesthes.

References

Acanthocinini